Clivipollia fragaria is a species of sea snail, a marine gastropod mollusk in the family Prodotiidae

Description
The length of the shell attains 25.6 mm.

Distribution
This species occurs in the Indian Ocean off Aldabra and Mozambique; also off the Philippines, the Maldives and Micronesia.

References

 Abbott, R.T. & S.P. Dance (1986). Compendium of sea shells. American Malacologists, Inc:Melbourne, Florida
 Fraussen K. & Stahlschmidt P. (2016). Revision of the Clivipollia group (Gastropoda: Buccinidae: Pisaniinae) with description of two new genera and three new species. Novapex. 17(2-3): 29-46
 Steyn, D. G.; Lussi, M. (2005). Offshore Shells of Southern Africa: A pictorial guide to more than 750 Gastropods. Published by the authors. pp. i–vi, 1–289.
 Kilburn R.N., Marais J.P. & Fraussen K. (2010) Buccinidae. Pp. 16-52, in: Marais A.P. & Seccombe A.D. (eds), Identification guide to the seashells of South Africa. Volume 1. Groenkloof: Centre for Molluscan Studies. 376 pp.

External links
 Reeve, L. A. (1846). Monograph of the genus Ricinula. In: Conchologia Iconica, or, illustrations of the shells of molluscous animals, vol. 3, pl. 1-6 and unpaginated text. L. Reeve & Co., London

Prodotiidae
Gastropods described in 1828